Travel the Road is an American reality television series that documents the lives of young missionaries Tim Scott and Will Decker through more than 25 different countries since 1998, in their efforts to bring Christianity into the most remote areas of the world.

Travel the Road is a part of the non-profit organization Challenge for Christ Ministries located in Los Angeles.  They are also partnered with Overland Missions.

Controversy in Afghanistan
In December 2008, the program attracted criticism from the Military Religious Freedom Foundation, a watchdog group whose stated goals are to ensure that religious freedom is maintained in the United States military. The MRFF claimed that Scott and Decker were embedded with American troops stationed in Afghanistan, despite the fact that, according to MRFF president Mikey Weinstein, the military exercises a "complete prohibition of the proselytizing of any religion, faith, or practice...You see [Scott and Decker] wearing American helmets. It is obvious they were completely embedded." When ABC News contacted the U.S. Army in Afghanistan about Scott and Decker's alleged embed, which had taken place four years previously, they said that they no longer have the documentation of the missionaries' status with the troops.

Scott defended the trip to Afghanistan, telling ABC, "It wasn't like we were hiding in the back saying we're going to preach. [The military] knew what we were doing. We told them that we were born again Christians, we're here doing ministry, we shoot for this TV station and we want to embed and see what it was like. We were interviewing the chaplains and we talked to them. We spoke at the services and things like that. So we did do our mission being over there as far as being able to document what the soldiers go through, what it's like in Afghanistan. So I could say that we were on a secular mission as well as far as documenting. I would say we were news reporters as well, we were delivering news of what was actually happening there, but we were also there to document the Christian side." Scott argued that since the pair were acting as Christian journalists, they had the same right to cover the war in Afghanistan as secular networks.

References

External links
 

2003 American television series debuts
2000s American reality television series
2010s American reality television series
2020s American reality television series
Trinity Broadcasting Network original programming
Christian entertainment television series